

The Yarra Trail is a shared use path for cyclists and pedestrians, which follows the Yarra River through the north eastern suburbs of Melbourne, Victoria, Australia.

The trail follows the river from near its mouth, through the city and suburbs to Westerfolds Park and Eltham. The Capital City Trail uses the same path up to Dights Falls, where it continues up the Merri Creek Trail as part of its loop around the city.

Following the Path
The path starts just to the north of West Gate Bridge near the mouth of the Yarra River as it enters Port Phillip Bay by the punt landing, allowing cyclists and pedestrians to cross to Spotswood and the Hobsons Bay Coastal Trail.

From the punt landing, the trail winds through Melbourne Docklands, initially as dedicated path on Lorimer Street and then east of Todd Road, continues as an on-road cycling lane on Lorimer Street.

At the west side of Yarra's Edge and before the Docklands Highway, head off the road towards the bank of the river. The trail can be picked up, where it intersects with the Capital City Trail, at the southern end of the "Koori Eel Trap" footbridge.

The trail passes the north side of the Melbourne Convention & Exhibition Centre, the Crown Casino and the restaurant sector of Southbank on the shared and often busy pedestrian boulevarde with excellent views of the Melbourne CBD across the Yarra River.

At the pedestrian bridge at Southbank pedestrians and cyclists can choose to continue on the south bank, or cross and follow the river on the north bank. The trail goes under the Princes Bridge next to Flinders Street station, which is the starting point for the St Kilda Road cycling lane to St Kilda Beach; and Swanston Street, a major cycling route through the city to RMIT University's city campus, Melbourne University and the inner northern suburbs.

On the north side of the river the trail passes Federation Square, the newly established riverside park of Birrarung Marr, Melbourne Park, and the Melbourne Cricket Ground. On the south bank of the Yarra River the trail passes several rowing clubs. It also passes the Royal Botanic Gardens and historic Como House nearby. At MacRobertson Bridge the paths meet on the north side of the river.

In Richmond the path meets up with the Gardiners Creek Trail. After going under the Victoria street bridge in Abbotsford the path reaches the Walmer Street shared pedestrian and cycle bridge.

Once across the bridge on the north side of the river, the trail continues up the short steep hill to the base of Walmer St ,and turns immediately to the left (west) into the park. The path continues until it reaches Yarra Boulevard, where the path descends to cross the Yarra River again at the Gipps Street shared pedestrian and cycle bridge. Alternatively, cyclists and pedestrians can continue to follow the Yarra Boulevard to Studley Park.

At Gipps Street, flights of steps connect to the concrete path on the western side of the river. Some cyclists choose to avoid the steps and ride the back streets of Abbotsford to meet the trail at the Collingwood Children's Farm.

A short way further the trail comes to Dights Falls, an ancient meeting place for the Wurundjeri people and tribes of the Kulin nation. The weir and water race were used to power the Ceres flour mill once located here. Here the Capital City Trail follows the Merri Creek Trail up the Merri Creek. The Yarra River Trail crosses the Merri Creek here, passes under the Eastern Freeway and starts a long gradual up hill climb to Melbourne Polytechnic, before crossing the Yarra river at the pedestrian Pipe bridge at the Fairfield boathouse. The bridge is fairly narrow and you will need to walk across when it is busy. On the eastern side of the river the path climbs up steeply to Yarra Boulevard. 

An alternative to the Yarra River Trail at Yarra Bend Park is to follow the Yarra Boulevard as it continues through the parkland of Yarra Bend following the river. It is a tourist drive with on-road cycling lanes, which provides access to the Studley Park boathouse, where row boats can be hired. After crossing the Eastern Freeway the road climbs up a hill where it meets the Yarra Trail again.

From the top of the hill follow the Yarra boulevard down to the Chandler Highway. A ramped connecting path (built 2019) leads under the main road and to the Yarra path, next to the National Guide Dog and Mobility Centre.

The northern end of the Anniversary Outer Circle Trail is 0.6 km from this point. Head south on the Chandler Highway and the Anniversary Trail can be found just across the bridge that crosses the Eastern Freeway. A safer alternative is to continue along the Yarra River Trail from the Chandler Highway to Willsmere Park - 1.5 km. You can cross under the Eastern Freeway at Willsmere Park and traverse to the Anniversary Trail via Hyde Park.

The Yarra River Trail  tracks along the northern edge of  the Eastern Freeway with first the La Trobe golf Club to the south over the river followed by the Kew Golf Club directly to the south. Yarra River is rejoined near Burke Road. The trail crosses over a footbridge to the north side of the Yarra, just before the trail passes beneath the Burke Road bridge over the Yarra and Eastern Freeway. If you travel straight ahead instead of turning left to cross the footbridge you will find yourself on the Koonung Creek Trail. From the footbridge you can also use a hilly path, including a usually quiet on-road section (The Boulevard, East Ivanhoe), to access the Sparks Reserve end of the Darebin Creek Trail.

Along river flats, beside sporting ovals, market gardens, and paddocks with horses: it is easy to forget this parkland is in the middle of Melbourne's suburbs as you ride through Ivanhoe, Heidelberg, Lower Plenty and Templestowe to Westerfolds Park where there are many paths to explore.

On the way to Westerfolds Park, there are turnoffs to the River Gum Walk Trail, the Plenty River Trail and the Ruffey Creek Trail.

The southern section of the River Gum Walk Trail can easily be mistaken for the continuation of the Yarra River Trail. People coming from the south along the Yarra River Trail should turn right (east) 130m after crossing the canal at the end of Plymouth St, near the Banyule Tennis centre.

From the northeast corner of Westerfolds Park, the path continues up the Yarra River 1km to Candlebark Park. Cross the long footbridge across the Yarra at Candlebark Park to access the Diamond Creek Trail. The intersection is unsigned except for some instructions relating to the usage of the park.

The Yarra trail continues to follow the river past Pettys orchards and finally ends at the confluence of the Mullum Mullum Creek and the Yarra River in Templestowe. A lookout surveys the spot. The Mullum Mullum Creek Trail starts here leading to points further afield.

Landmarks
Yarra River, Docklands, Southbank, Yarra Bend Park, Collingwood Children's Farm, Westerfolds Park.

Connections
The trail leads to numerous other trails. Going from west to east:
Capital City Trail, Anniversary Trail, Koonung Creek Trail, River Gum Walk Trail, Plenty River Trail, Ruffey Creek Trail, Diamond Creek Trail and lower Mullum Mullum Creek Trail.

See also
Yarra River
Parklands adjoining the Yarra River

References 

Bike rides around Melbourne 3rd edition, 2009, Julia Blunden, Open Spaces Publishing,

External links
An interactive map of the trail as well as others in the Melbourne area is available here: Walking and Cycling in Melbourne
Map of Yarra Trail

Bicycle Network (formerly Bicycle Victoria), includes link to Bikely route map
Boroondara BUG - Chandler Hwy stairs
Boroondara BUG - Gipps Street stairs
Boroondara BUG - Belford Rd hill & the proposed Eastern Veloway
Yarra BUG Gipps Street stairs
Yarra punt
Parks Victoria - Westerfolds Park

Bike paths in Melbourne
Yarra River
Heidelberg, Victoria